Jawad Abu Hatab (born 1962) is a Syrian politician. Since May 2016 he has served as Minister of Defence in the Syrian Interim Government. He also served as Prime Minister, resigning on 10 March 2019. Prior to his election as Prime Minister, he worked as a heart surgeon and served in various roles within the Syrian opposition.

Early life and career
Hatab was born in 1962 in Damascus. He completed his higher education at the medical school of Damascus University in 1988. He subsequently worked as a heart surgeon at the Cardiac Surgery Hospital located within the hospital. Hatab travelled to Italy in 2003 and completed his studies to become a paediatric cardiologist.

Political career
After the commencement of the Syrian civil war, Hatab served in various administrative roles within the Syrian opposition. In May 2016 he was elected as Prime Minister of the partially-recognised Syrian Interim Government. During his tenure, he sought to improve service delivery in opposition-controlled areas and relocate opposition government officials from Turkey to Syria.

References

1962 births
Living people
Damascus University alumni
National Coalition of Syrian Revolutionary and Opposition Forces members
Syrian expatriates in Italy
Syrian cardiologists